Saint Thomas Becket window in Chartres Cathedral is a 1215–1225 stained-glass window in Chartres Cathedral, located behind a grille in the Confessors' Chapel, second chapel of the south ambulatory. 8.9 m high by 2.18 m wide, it was funded by the tanners' guild. The furthest left of five lancet windows in the chapel, it is difficult to view and is heavily corroded by glass oxidisation, which has made its left side especially hard to read.

It is contemporary with the current cathedral, built after an 1194 fire. It was classed as a monument historique in the first listing in 1840. The window was restored by Gaudin in 1921 and by Lorin's workshop in 1996. It is split vertically into eleven equal registers by ten horizontal leadwork pieces.

Motifs

The window is made up of four main circles, each on two registers. Those registers are made up of square panels showing the story and two border panels. Between each main circle is an intermediate register with a central quatrefoil with a square story panel at its centre, surrounded on both sides by two rectangular panels continuing the border and a half-quatrefoil also showing the story.

The four circles with a blue background are bordered by a red "orle", then a blue "orle" sown with yellow quatrefoil flowers and by a narrow band of white pearls.

Background 
Henry II of England made Thomas Becket chancellor of England in 1155, in which role he lived the life of a great lord. He then made him Archbishop of Canterbury in 1162, hoping he would submit the church to state power, but Thomas took the opposite course and was exiled to France, where he spent several long stays in Chartres, accompanied by his friend and secretary John of Salisbury, who in 1176 became Bishop of Chartres. In the meantime Thomas was murdered in Canterbury Cathedral by four of the king's knights in 1170 and canonised only three years later.

The window was made only fifty years after Becket's exile and martyrdom, during the final years of Philip II Augustus's reign, which also saw the struggle against local powers giving rise to the Kingdom of France. Philip had ejected Odo of Sully as archbishop of Paris after the latter spoke against Philip's divorce, leading Odo to put the kingdom under interdict. This gave a contemporary French resonance to the window's portrayal of Becket resisting a 'bad king' interfering in the Church, whereas a 'good king' should protect the Church.

Differences
The window's composition is very different to others at Chartres, in which the main subject's story was told uninterrupted from bottom to top. That of Becket shows the saint's exile in the first main circle on the bottom two registers, whilst the third register shows the donors in an unusually high position (they were usually shown at the base and sides of the lowest register).

The main hagiography of Becket only begins in the fourth register onwards, with a halo only added on his deathbed after his martyrdom, though the exile images also show him with a halo. These anomalies suggest that the first main circle should be read as an independent narrative and a specific memorial to his visit to Chartres, perhaps even drawing on accounts of him by those who saw him there. This interpretation would make the register with the donors a border between the exile window and the main hagiography.

Description

Thomas crosses to France

Donors

Life of Thomas Becket 
The images quite faithfully follow the text of the office of matins for the feast of Thomas Becket on 29 December.

(i) Thomas, defender of the church 

On the left panel, a hard-to-read group of monks assist in the mitred Thomas' departure. He is shown on horseback in the central panel, flanked by two monks also on horseback, riding towards the group on the left to take a last look at those he is leaving. The scene is flanked by two stylised trees representing a forest.

Thomas spent two years at Pontigny, ending in 1166, before returning to Sens, where he could spend his exile more safely.

(iii) The conflict escalates

(iv) Murder in the Cathedral 

The mitred bishop leads a clerk towards the cathedral, which is shown with a red door and double flying buttresses in the Gothic style of the new cathedral at Chartres (in Thomas' time Canterbury Cathedral was still a piece of Romanesque architecture). The scene is outside, as demonstrated by the crenellated ridge on the roof. To the right the knights lie in wait in their helmets, mailcoats and shields without coats of arms. The murder occurred whilst Thomas was on his way to Vespers.

These two panels read as a single scene, with Romanesque arches evoking the cathedral interior. To the left is the red door just passed through by the knights, whilst to the far right is an altar, evoking Christ's sacrifice, although the murder actually occurred in a transept near the stairs up to the choir. As conventional in images of the murder, Thomas is shown kneeling, with Fitzurse making the final blow into his head and mitre, slicing off the top of his skull and wounding Edward Grim, shown holding the episcopal cross, who later wrote an account of the murder. Behind Fitzurse are the other three knights.

The last scene shows not Thomas' burial but the initial miracles at his tomb. He is shown with a halo resting on a tomb supported by columns, allowing pilgrims to pass below it. To the left a sick man rests on his crutches, whilst to the right a blind man holds his hands to his eyes. Above an angel with a red halo (the liturgical colour of martyrdom) censes the saint. In the angel's left hand is a circular loaf, symbolising the "bread of angels" from Psalm 78, 24 ("he rained manna on them for food, he gave them the bread of heaven") and thus evoking God's response to the martyr's intercession.

References

External links
  Vie de Saint Thomas Becket, vitrail 18, La Cathédrale de Chartres.
 Bay 18 – St Thomas Becket , Chartres Cathedral – the Medieval Stained Glass, The Corpus of Medieval Narrative Art.
  Thomas de Cantorbury, La Légende dorée, Jacques de Voragine.

Chartres Cathedral
Stained glass windows
Chartres
Gothic art
13th-century works